Mohammadou Al Hadji Adamou (born 26 November 1986) is a Cameroonian-born Indonesian semi-professional footballer who plays as a centre-back. On January 31, 2018, he officially became an Indonesian citizen after going through naturalization process.

Career

Barito Putera
On 26 April 2016, Mohammadou signed one-year contract with Liga 1 club PS Barito Putera. He made his debut as a professional on 30 April 2016, starting and playing the full 90 minutes in a 1–2 loss against Bhayangkara.

Borneo
On 12 March 2018, Mohammadou signed one-year contract with Liga 1 club Borneo. On 25 March 2018, Mohammadou made his debut against Sriwijaya in the 2018 Liga 1 in a 0–0 draw home at Segiri Samarinda Stadium.

Sriwijaya
In middle season 2018, Al Hadji signed a year contract with Liga 1 club Sriwijaya from Borneo. He made his league debut on 11 August 2018 against Madura United at the Gelora Sriwijaya Stadium, Palembang.

PSMS Medan
He was signed for PSMS Medan to play in Liga 2 in the 2019 season. He made 7 league appearances and scored 1 goal for PSMS Medan.

Serpong City
He was signed for Serpong City to play in Liga 3 in the 2021 season. Al Hadji made his debut on 3 November 2021 in a match against Jagat. He made 16 league appearances and without scoring a goal for Serpong City.

Career statistics

References

External links
Mohammadou Al Hadji at Soccerway

1986 births
Living people
Cameroonian footballers
Naturalised citizens of Indonesia
Indonesian people of Cameroonian descent
Indonesian people of Malian descent
Semen Padang F.C. players
PS Barito Putera players
Borneo F.C. players
Sriwijaya F.C. players
Liga 1 (Indonesia) players
Indonesian Premier Division players
Association football defenders